The 2022 season of The 6ixty, also known as Sky Exch The 6ixty, for sponsorship reasons, was a T10 cricket tournament organized by Cricket West Indies (CWI) and the Caribbean Premier League (CPL) which was played in St. Kitts and Nevis in its inaugural edition, which took place in August 2022 in the lead-up to the CPL. There were both a men's and women's edition of the tournament running at the same time, with the teams and their player rosters being mostly the same as in the CPL and Women's CPL. Several changes were made to the usual rules of T10 cricket in the competition.

The women's tournament was won by Barbados Royals and the men's tournament was won by St Kitts & Nevis Patriots.

Background 
The 6ixty was inspired in part by the success of several local T10 competitions that have been organized around the West Indies. It was also meant to grow the women's game by building on the foundations established by the women's T10 exhibition matches that were played just before the 2019 CPL playoffs.

Chris Gayle has been named the Brand Ambassador for the tournament, with the trophy (the "Universe Boss Trophy") named after him.

Scheduling 
The first edition of the tournament was played from August 24 to 28 at the Warner Park Sporting Complex stadium in St. Kitts and Nevis. There was a concurrent men's and women's tournament, with all of the six teams from the Caribbean Premier League and the three teams from the Women's Caribbean Premier League participating. 

There was a total of 12 men's games and 7 women's games played, with each men's team playing 3 games, and each women's team playing 4 games. The playoffs in the men's edition featured the 1st place team in the league playing the 4th place team in one semi-final, and 2nd vs 3rd in the other semi-final, with the final then to follow. The women's edition went directly from the league stage to the final, which was contested by the top two teams in the league stage. 

Organizers plan to organize the competition four times a year, with the possibility of hosting one of these quarterly events outside of the West Indies.

Rules 
The 6ixty is played in the T10 format of cricket (also referred to by its organizers as "60-ball cricket"), meaning that in each game, each team bats for a maximum of 10 overs (60 legal balls), each bowler bowls a maximum of two overs, and games last approximately 90 minutes. However, the following rules are added in The 6ixty:

 Teams are all out (i.e. they can't bat anymore) upon losing 6 wickets, rather than 10.
 The first 5 overs of each innings will all be bowled from one end of the pitch, with the other 5 overs bowled from the other end.
 Fielding teams must bowl the 10 overs of an innings within 45 minutes, or they lose a fielder during the final over.
 The batting team can 'unlock' a third powerplay over by hitting two sixes in the initial two powerplay overs.
 Fans will be able to vote to decide the timing of a "Mystery Free Hit" in each innings. (This will be a delivery on which the batters can't be dismissed in almost any way.)

Squads

Men's
The following squads were named for the tournament.

Women's
The following squads were named for the tournament.

Points tables

Men's

  advanced to the Semifinals

Women's

  advanced to the Final

Women's fixtures

League stage

Final

Men's fixtures

League stage

Playoffs

Semifinal 1

Semifinal 2

Final

Statistics

Most runs

Men

Source: ESPNcricinfo

Women

Source: ESPNcricinfo

Most wickets

Men

Source: ESPNcricinfo

Women

Source: ESPNcricinfo

References

External links
Women's Series home at ESPN Cricinfo
Men's Series home at ESPN Cricinfo

Ten10 cricket leagues
2022 in West Indian cricket